The Columbus Comets are a women's professional American football team based in Columbus, Ohio.  They play in the Women's Football Alliance.  The Comets played in the National Women's Football Association from their inception in 2003 until 2008 (in 2003 they were known as the Columbus Flames).  Their home games are played at Grove City Christian School in Grove City, Ohio.

Season-by-season results

|-
| colspan="6" align="center" | Columbus Flames (NWFA)
|-
|2003 || 6 || 3 || 0 || 3rd Northern Mid-Atlantic || --
|-
| colspan="6" align="center" | Columbus Comets (NWFA)
|-
|2004 || 7 || 3 || 0 || 2nd Northern Great Lakes || Won Northern Conference Quarterfinal (Massachusetts)Lost Northern Conference Semifinal (Detroit)
|-
|2005 || 6 || 3 || 0 || 5th Northern || Lost Northern Conference Quarterfinal (Southwest Michigan)
|-
|2006 || 7 || 4 || 0 || 2nd Northern North Central || Won League Wild Card (West Michigan)Won League Quarterfinal (Pensacola)Lost League Semifinal (D.C.)
|-
|2007 || 9 || 4 || 0 || 2nd Southern North || Won Southern Conference Quarterfinal (Pensacola)Won Southern Conference Semifinal (Chattanooga)Won Southern Conference Championship (Oklahoma City)Lost NWFA Championship (Pittsburgh)
|-
|2008 || 7 || 3 || 0 || 1st Northern Central || Won Northern Conference Quarterfinal (Fort Wayne)Lost Northern Conference Semifinal (Philadelphia)
|-
| colspan="6" align="center" | Columbus Comets (WFA)
|-
|2009 || 9 || 1 || 0 || 1st National Mid-Atlantic || Lost National Conference Semifinal (West Michigan)
|-
|2010 || 11 || 1 || 0 || 1st National Mid-Atlantic ||  Won National Conference Quarterfinal (Baltimore)Won National Conference Semifinal (Philadelphia)Won National Conference Championship (St. Louis)Lost WFA Championship (Lone Star)
|-
|2011 || 5 || 3 || 0 || 3rd National Mid-Atlantic || --
|-
|2012 || 2 || 6 || 0 || 3rd National Mid-Atlantic || --
|-
|2013 || 6 || 5 || 0 || 3rd National Mid-Atlantic || Won National Conference Wild Card (New York)Lost National Conference Quarterfinal (D.C.)
|-
|2014 || 5 || 5 || 0 || 2nd National Mid-Atlantic || Won National Conference Wild Card (Toledo)Lost National Conference Quarterfinal (D.C.)
|-
|2015 || 2 || 6 || 0 || 3rd National Mid-Atlantic || --
|-
|2016 || 5 || 5 || 0 || 3rd WFA2 National Northeast || Won National Conference Quarterfinal (Indy)Lost National Conference Semifinal (Philadelphia)
|-
|2017 || 4 || 4 || 0 || 4th WFA2 National Northeast || --
|-
!Total || 91 || 56 || 0
|colspan="2"| (including playoffs)

2016 roster

2009

Season schedule

2010

Season schedule

2011

Standings

Season schedule

** = Won by forfeit

2012

Standings

Season schedule

References

External links
Columbus Comets website
Women's Football Talk Interview with Coach Patterson

National Women's Football Association teams
Women's Football Alliance teams
American football teams in Columbus, Ohio
American football teams established in 2003
2003 establishments in Ohio
Women's sports in Ohio
Franklin County, Ohio